Pavlovo-Posadskiye izvestiya is a regional weekly state-run newspaper in Pavlovsky Posad, Russia.  It was founded in July 1919.

Since March 2005, the newspaper has been issued by the state institution of Moscow Oblast, The News Agency Of Pavlovsky Posad District. 

The newspaper provides information on the government of Moscow Oblast and local government municipalities, The Chief Editor is Elena Krasova.

History

In 1919, the newspaper was founded as Pavlovskiye Izvestiya.  Since then, the name has been changed on several occasions (Udarnik, 1934, Leninskaya Iskra, 1950s, Znamya Lenina, 1961), until, in 1999, it became officially known as Pavlovo-Posadskiye izvestiya.

In 2005, the editorial office was reorganized and transformed into the state institution of Moscow Oblast, The News Agency Of Pavlovsky Posad District.
 
In 2014, the newspaper celebrated its 95th anniversary.

External links 
  

1919 establishments in Russia
Newspapers established in 1919
Newspapers published in the Soviet Union
Russian-language newspapers published in Russia
Weekly newspapers published in Russia